Lubefu is a territory in Sankuru province of the Democratic Republic of the Congo.

Territories of Sankuru Province
Democratic Republic of Congo geography articles needing translation from French Wikipedia